Tel Aviv is the journal of the Tel Aviv University Institute of Archaeology. It is a biannual peer-reviewed academic journal published by Routledge. It publishes articles on recent archaeological research in the Southern Levant and studies in Near Eastern archaeology. Its main focus is the biblical and protohistoric periods (Iron Age, Bronze Age, Chalcolithic and Neolithic). It also publishes some articles on classical and prehistoric archaeology.

See also
Israel Exploration Journal

References

External links

|https://en-humanities.tau.ac.il/node/3303 Journal page]] at The Sonia & Marco Nadler Institute of Archaeology

Archaeology journals
Middle Eastern studies journals
Publications established in 1974
English-language journals
Biannual journals